This list of churches in Lejre Municipality lists church buildings in Lejre Municipality, Denmark.

List

See also
 Listed buildings in Frederikssund Municipality

References

External links

 Nordens kirker: Nordsjælland

 
Lejre